Manu Needhi is a 2000 Indian Tamil-language film directed by Thambi Ramaiah. The film stars Murali and Prathyusha, while Vadivelu, Napoleon and Nassar play other supporting roles. The film has music by Deva, cinematography by B. Balamurugan, and editing by Pazhanivel. The film released on 23 December 2000.

Plot
Chinnakkannu (Murali) lives in a village with his maternal uncle Vellaiyan (Nassar). Vellaiyan asks Chinnakkanu to woo Poongodi (Prathyusha), the only daughter of Muthuraja (Napoleon), a rich Zamindar of a nearby village. Chinnakannu succeeds in his attempt to woo Poongodi, but on the day of wedding between Chinnakkannu and Poongodi, Vellaiyan interrupts and takes away Chinnakannu with him cancelling the wedding. A flashback is shown where Muthuraja is widely respected by everyone in his village. One day, he gets drunk and rapes a girl without consciousness. The victim is Vellaiyan's fiancé (Priyanka), who happens to be Chinnakannu's sister. Muthuraja realises his mistake and marries the victim. However, she dies during her delivery, and Poongodi is born to her. Vellaiyan plans to revenge Muthuraja by using Chinnakannu. Finally, after many events, Chinnakannu marries Poongodi.

Cast
Murali as Chinnakannu
Prathyusha as Poongodi
Vadivelu as Sevalai
Napoleon as Muthazhagu Thevar
Nassar as Vellaiyan
Priyanka as Vellaiyan's fiancé
Thambi Ramaiah as Dharmalingam, marriage broker
Sithara as Poongodi's mother
Mahanadi Shankar
Thalapathy Dinesh
G. Ramachandran as Chittappa

Soundtrack
Music was composed by Deva and lyrics were written by Kalaikumar, Snehan and Lakshmi Priyan.

Release
The film received positive reviews upon release and many appreciated Vadivelu's comedy.
ChennaiOnline wrote "The screenplay is well etched with the right dose of humour, action and sentiment. It is only in the second half that the director gets a bit distracted and includes new characters [..]". A critic BBThots noted "strong performances by a couple of senior artistes and the occasionally funny comedy sequences prevent this otherwise familiar village story from being too boring". The Hindu wrote "Manuneedhi has nothing new to offer. Just the same old plot handled in just about the same old way!". New Straits Times wrote "Catch this movie if you like countryside-based stories".

References

2000 films
2000s Tamil-language films
Indian drama films
Films scored by Deva (composer)
2000 directorial debut films